The Pryluky Regiment was one of the seventeen territorial-administrative subdivisions of the Hetman State. The regiment's capital was the city of Pryluky, now in the Chernihiv Oblast, north-central Ukraine.

History
The regiment was created during the Khmelnytsky Uprising. Following the signing of the Treaty of Zboriv in 1649 it consisted a total of 21 companies, and had 2,100 registered Cossacks. During the uprising the regiment took part in the Battle of Berestechko in 1651. When a civil war emerged among the cossacks the Hetmanate was split along the Dnieper River into Left-bank Ukraine and Right-bank Ukraine, which placed the regiment under the control of Left-bank Ukraine hetmans. The regiment was involved in successfully suppressing Martyn Pushkar's revolt against the Vyhovsky government. After the Treaty of Andrusovo in 1667, the Tsardom of Russia gained sovereignty over Left-bank Ukraine and its regiments came under the administration of Russia.  

In 1782 the regiment had 11 companies and a population of 69,200. In 1782 the regiment was disbanded by the order of the Empress Catherine the Great. All of the regiment's territories were included into the Chernigov Governorate.

External links
Encyclopedia of Ukraine

Cossack Hetmanate Regiments
History of Chernihiv Oblast